The Erdene Zuu Monastery (Chinese:光顯寺, Tibetan:ལྷུན་གྲུབ་བདེ་ཆེན་གླིང་) is probably the earliest surviving Buddhist monastery in Mongolia. Located in Övörkhangai Province, approximately 2 km north-east from the center of Kharkhorin and adjacent to the ancient city of Karakorum, it is part of the Orkhon Valley Cultural Landscape World Heritage Site. The monastery is affiliated with the Gelug sect of Tibetan Buddhism.

History
Abtai Sain Khan, ruler of the Khalkha Mongols and grandfather of Zanabazar, the first Jebtsundamba Khutuktu, ordered construction of the Erdene Zuu monastery in 1585 after his meeting with the 3rd Dalai Lama and the declaration of Tibetan Buddhism as the state religion of Mongolia. Stones from the nearby ruins of the ancient Mongol capital of Karakorum were used in its construction. Planners attempted to create a surrounding wall that resembled a Tibetan Buddhist rosary featuring 108 stupas (108 being a sacred number in Buddhism), but this objective was probably never achieved. The monastery's temple walls were painted, and the Chinese-style roof covered with green tiles.

The monastery was damaged in 1688 during one of the many wars between Dzungars and Khalkha Mongols. Locals dismantled the wooden fortifications of the abandoned monastery. It was rebuilt in the 18th century and by 1872 had a full 62 temples and housed up to 1000 monks.

According to tradition, in 1745, a local Buddhist disciple named Bunia made several unsuccessful attempts to fly with a device he invented which was similar to a parachute.

In 1939, the communist leader Khorloogiin Choibalsan ordered the monastery destroyed, as part of a purge that obliterated hundreds of monasteries in Mongolia and killed over ten thousand monks. Three small temples and the external wall with the stupas survived the initial onslaught. By 1944, Joseph Stalin pressured Choibalsan to maintain the monastery (along with Gandantegchinlen Monastery in Ulaanbaatar) as a showpiece for international visitors, such as U.S. Vice President Henry Wallace, to prove that the communist regime allowed freedom of religion. In 1947, the temples were converted into museums and for the four decades that followed Gandantegchinlen Khiid Monastery became Mongolia's only functioning monastery.

After the fall of communism in Mongolia in 1990, the monastery was turned over to the lamas and Erdene Zuu again became a place of worship. Today, Erdene Zuu remains an active Buddhist monastery as well as a museum that is open to tourists.

On a hill outside the monastery sits a stone phallus called Kharkhorin Rock. The phallus is said to restrain the sexual impulses of the monks and ensure their good behavior.

Gallery

References

External links

Official website
Article with pictures
Encyclopædia Britannica article on Karakorum and Erdene Zuu.
 Photo collection at Culture Mongolia
A few pictures
Excerpt from article "The Life of Zanabazar"; discusses the construction of Erdene Zuu

Tibetan Buddhist temples
Buddhist monasteries in Mongolia
Gelug monasteries
1585 establishments in Asia
Religious organizations established in the 1580s
Tibetan Buddhism in Mongolia
Övörkhangai Province